Pyar Mohabbat is a 1966 Indian Bollywood film produced and directed by Shankar Mukherjee. It stars Dev Anand and Saira Banu in pivotal roles.

Plot
After running away from home, Prince Naresh Kumar Singh (Dev Anand) now calls himself Dilip Singh, returns home after a period of 18 years. He travels by ship, and meets Reeta Singh (Saira Banu), and after a series of misunderstandings, both fall in love with each other. When Dilip reaches Devangarh, he is shocked to find that his brother, Rana Mahesh Kumar Singh (Murad) is dead; his mother, Rajmata Rajeshwari (Durga Khote) is blind; and the throne-prince to be crowned is the Senapati Uday Singh (Premnath), who has also killed Naresh. Rajmata is convinced that her son Naresh is still alive, and will return one day, and refuses to permit Uday to ascend the throne. In order to fool the Rajmata, Uday recruits Dilip to pose as the missing prince, Naresh. How long will Uday Singh continue to pull wool over the eyes of the Rajmata? Will Dilip alias Naresh Singh survive long enough to ascend the throne, and reveal his true identity?

Cast
 Dev Anand as Naresh Kumar Singh / Dilip Singh
 Saira Banu as Reeta Singh
 Prem Nath as Senapati Uday Kumar Singh
 Shashikala as Mohini
 Durga Khote as Rajmata Rajeshwari
 David Abraham as Dilip's friend
 Asit Sen as Reeta's Secretary
 Sulochana Latkar
 Harindranath Chattopadhyay as Thakur Shamsher Singh
 Tarun Bose
 Murad as Rana Mahesh Kumar Singh

Soundtrack

References

External links

1960s Hindi-language films
1966 films
Films scored by Shankar–Jaikishan